Carlos Martínez (born 29 September 1978) is a Mexican boxer. He competed in the men's light welterweight event at the 1996 Summer Olympics.

References

1978 births
Living people
Mexican male boxers
Olympic boxers of Mexico
Boxers at the 1996 Summer Olympics
Boxers from Mexico City
Light-welterweight boxers